Anugrah Memorial B.Ed. College, Gaya (A.M. B.Ed. College Gaya) is an educational institution offering undergraduate academic degree in Bachelor of Education (B.Ed.), located in Gaya, Bihar, India and is the  first B. Ed. unit established in any constituent college of Magadh University.It is recognized by N.C.T.E., government of India. Prof. (Dr.) Lakshmi Narayan Singh, a  professor of repute, is the Director of the institute.

See also
 List of teacher education schools in India

External links
 A. M. B.Ed. College
First B.Ed. unit-The Inception

References

Universities and colleges in Bihar
Colleges of education in India
Technical universities and colleges in India
Education in Gaya, India
Educational institutions established in 2013
2013 establishments in Bihar